In mathematics the Karoubi envelope (or Cauchy completion or idempotent completion) of a category C is a classification of the idempotents of C, by means of an auxiliary category. Taking the Karoubi envelope of a preadditive category gives a pseudo-abelian category, hence the construction is sometimes called the pseudo-abelian completion. It is named for the French mathematician Max Karoubi.

Given a category C, an idempotent of C is an endomorphism 

with 

.

An idempotent e: A → A is said to split if there is an object B and morphisms f: A → B,
g : B → A such that e = g f and 1B = f g.

 

where  is a morphism of C satisfying  (or equivalently ).

Composition in Split(C) is as in C, but the identity morphism 

The category C embeds fully and faithfully in Split(C). In Split(C) every idempotent splits, and Split(C) is the universal category with this property.
The Karoubi envelope of a category C can therefore be considered as the "completion" of C which splits idempotents.

The category of presheaves on C is equivalent to the category of presheaves on Split(C).

Automorphisms in the Karoubi envelope 

An automorphism in Split(C) is of the form , with inverse  satisfying:

 
 
 

If the first equation is relaxed to just have , then f is a partial automorphism (with inverse g). A (partial) involution in Split(C) is a self-inverse (partial) automorphism.

Examples

 If C has products, then given an isomorphism  the mapping , composed with the canonical map  of symmetry, is a partial involution.
 If C is a triangulated category, the Karoubi envelope Split(C) can be endowed with the structure of a triangulated category such that the canonical functor C → Split(C) becomes a triangulated functor.
The Karoubi envelope is used in the construction of several categories of motives.
The Karoubi envelope construction takes semi-adjunctions to adjunctions. For this reason the Karoubi envelope is used in the study of models of the untyped lambda calculus. The Karoubi envelope of an extensional lambda model (a monoid, considered as a category) is cartesian closed.
 The category of projective modules over any ring is the Karoubi envelope of its full subcategory of free modules.
 The category of vector bundles over any paracompact space is the Karoubi envelope of its full subcategory of trivial bundles.

References

 

Category theory